Nicolás Pereira was the defending champion, but did not compete this year.

Sargis Sargsian won the title by defeating Brett Steven 7–6(7–0), 4–6, 7–5 in the final.

Seeds

Draw

Finals

Top half

Bottom half

References

External links
 Official results archive (ATP)
 Official results archive (ITF)

1997 Singles